The Manta Foxbat is an American ultralight aircraft that was designed by Bill Armour and produced by Manta Products Inc of Oakland, California. The aircraft was supplied as a kit for amateur construction.

Design and development
It features a cable-braced high-wing, a single-seat, open cockpit, tricycle landing gear and a single engine in pusher configuration.

The aircraft is made from bolted-together aluminum tubing, with the wing covered in Dacron sailcloth. Its  span wing is supported by cables strung from an inverted V style kingpost. The wing is derived from the Manta Fledge hang glider wing. The control system is unconventional and uses a hang glider style control bar for weight shift control of pitch and roll, augmented with wing tip rudders for yaw, activated by hand controls on the control bar. The fuselage is an open frame structure that is attached to the wing via a flexible single point mount, to allow weight shift control. The pilot is accommodated on a sling seat. The landing gear is of tricycle configuration, with a steerable nose wheel.

The Foxbat wing can be folded for ground transport and storage.

Variants
Fledge III
Initial model, developed from the Manta Fledge hang glider
FX-3
Foxbat
Model powered by a Kawasaki 440 of

Specifications (FX-3)

See also

References

External links
Photo of a Foxbat

1980s United States ultralight aircraft
Homebuilt aircraft
Single-engined pusher aircraft